Life. Be in it. is a health promotion and advertising charity, primarily known for its campaign encouraging people to be more active, started in 1975 by the Victorian state government. Following the loss of government funding in 1981, it became an independent charity and has intermittently run adverts on Australian and occasionally American television, featuring the animated character Norm. The National Museum of Australia included Life. Be in it in their Defining Moments in Australian History project.

Television campaign
The television advertisements for the program are cartoons featuring people doing a wide range of activities, with a catchy tune "Be in it today, live more of your life". The main character is Norm, a middle aged man with a prominent beer belly, meant to represent a "normal" Australian bloke.  The idea for Norm and the advertising came from Phillip Adams and Alex Stitt; Stitt drew all the cartoons. In the original run of television advertisements, Norm was voiced by Max Gillies. In the 2000 revival, the voice was provided by Dr Colin Benjamin. The original theme music for the campaign was created by Peter Best.

The program began in 1975 with the Victorian state government, developed by the Monahan Dayman Adams advertising company, underneath Brian Dixon, former Australian rules footballer and then Minister for Youth, Sport and Recreation. The original concept of 'Life, be in it' was created by Dr John Cooper and Oscar Scherl and was presented to the agency in the early 1970s.

Following success in Victoria, Dixon claimed 35% of Victorian's had become more active as a result of the campaign, the federal government funded and relaunched the program nationally in 1978. This new relaunch subtley redesigned to make the main character Norm more pathetic, due to concerns too many people had identified with him positively. The campaign also aired in the United States on local television stations during the 1970s and 1980s.

One of their early programs was to bring over Pat Farrington, a co-founder of the New Games, supplying her with five vans and 25 volunteers to drive around rural townships in Victoria, teaching people how to play games (New Games Book: p22).

The campaign was relaunched in 2000, after several years of inactivity, for the 25th anniversary of the original campaign. It again went into hibernation afterwards. The Victorian opposition party promised to relaunch the campaign during the 2018 state election. Subsequently, the original artist Alex Stitt's widow called the plan anachronistic and inappropriate. The campaign was finally relaunched in 2023 with the partnership of Roy Morgan. The original adverts were redesigned for high definition television, and the campaign written written to focus on active again after the COVID-19 pandemic.

State based associations
State-based associations run campaigns and health education on behalf of the national charity, including Life. Be in it. South Australia, which runs health programs at Unley High School and Life. Be in it FunWorks in Queensland and New South Wales, which hold fitness events for youth. Previously, Life. Be in it. Victoria also ran health programs.

See also
 Troy Black
 Go for Your Life

References

External links 
 
 Life. Be in it. Character Norm is to reappear, Perth radio 6PR interview, 7 November 2000, transcript reproduced at lifebeinit.org
 Life. Be in it. Silver Anniversary and Relaunch, 22 November 2000, at lifebeinit.org

Australian advertising slogans
1975 neologisms
Government of Australia
Public service announcements
Advertising in Australia
Physical exercise